Salud Ortiz Carbajal (born November 18, 1964) is an American politician serving as the U.S. representative for California's 24th congressional district since 2017. He is a member of the Democratic Party, and his district covers Santa Maria, San Luis Obispo and Santa Barbara.

Early life and education
Carbajal was born in Moroleón, Mexico, in 1964 and immigrated to the United States, initially to Arizona, later settling in Oxnard, California, with his family, where his father was a farmworker.

Carbajal attended the University of California, Santa Barbara, where he earned a Bachelor of Arts degree in 1990, and Fielding Graduate University, where he earned a master's degree in organizational management.

Early political career 
Carbajal served in the United States Marine Corps Reserve for eight years, including during the Gulf War, although he did not leave the contiguous United States.

Santa Barbara County Board of Supervisors
Carbajal was first elected to the Santa Barbara County Board of Supervisors in 2004, representing the first district as a Democrat. He was reelected in 2008 and 2012.

U.S. House of Representatives

Elections

2016 

In 2015, Carbajal announced his intention to run for the 24th district after incumbent Lois Capps announced her retirement. Carbajal was seen as one of the two Democratic front-runners in the open primary, alongside Santa Barbara Mayor Helene Schneider, and was rivaled by Republican front-runners Assemblyman Katcho Achadjian and small businessman and former Congressional aide Justin Fareed. The primary field consisted of four Democrats, three Republicans, and two independent candidates.

In the June 7 primary, Carbajal came in first, with 66,402 votes (31.9%). The runner-up was Fareed, who received 42,521 (20.5%).

In the November 8 general election, Carbajal received 53.4% of the vote to Fareed's 46.6%, a popular vote margin of about 21,000.

2018 

Carbajal was reelected over Republican challenger Fareed with 58.6% of the vote.

2020 

Carbajal was reelected to a third term over Republican challenger Andy Caldwell, a nonprofit executive, with 58.7% of the vote.

Tenure

As of October 2021, Carbajal had voted in line with Joe Biden's stated position 100% of the time.

Committee assignments
Committee on Armed Services
Subcommittee on Readiness
Subcommittee on Tactical Air and Land Forces
Committee on Agriculture
Committee on Transportation and Infrastructure

Caucus memberships
New Democrat Coalition
House Baltic Caucus
Congressional Hispanic Caucus
Congressional Asian Pacific American Caucus
Climate Solutions Caucus
Problem Solvers Caucus
Congressional Solar Caucus

Political positions

Abortion
Carbajal opposed the overturning of Roe v. Wade, calling it a "betrayal to our Constitution and...millions of women who count on its protections to retain control of their own body and choices."

Personal life

Carbajal lives in Santa Barbara, California and is married to Gina, with whom he has two children.

On October 6, 2020, Carbajal announced that he had tested positive for COVID-19.

See also

 List of Hispanic and Latino Americans in the United States Congress

References

External links

 Congressman Salud Carbajal official U.S. House website
 Salud Carbajal for Congress campaign website
 
 

|-

1964 births
21st-century American politicians
United States Marine Corps personnel of the Gulf War
American politicians of Mexican descent
County supervisors in California
Hispanic and Latino American members of the United States Congress
Living people
Democratic Party members of the United States House of Representatives from California
Mexican emigrants to the United States
Military personnel from California
People from Moroleón
People from Oxnard, California
People from Santa Barbara, California
People with acquired American citizenship
United States Marine Corps reservists
Politicians from Guanajuato
University of California, Santa Barbara alumni